Ankit Lamba (born 3 December 1991) is an Indian first-class cricketer who plays for Rajasthan.

References

External links
 

1991 births
Living people
Indian cricketers
Rajasthan cricketers
Place of birth missing (living people)